The 2013 Guangzhou R&F season is the 3rd year in Guangzhou R&F's existence and its 3rd season in the Chinese football league, also its 2nd season in the top flight.

References

Chinese football clubs 2013 season
Guangzhou City F.C. seasons